Pseudevernia is a genus of foliose lichens in the family Parmeliaceae. The type species of the genus, Pseudevernia furfuracea (commonly known as tree moss), has substantial commercial value in the perfume industry.

Systematics

Pseudevernia was circumscribed by German botanist Friedrich Wilhelm Zopf in 1903 with Pseudevernia furfuracea as the type species. 

Pseudevernia is a member of the Hypogymnioid clade of the family Parmeliaceae; this clade, which also includes the genera Arctoparmelia, Brodoa, and Hypogymnia, is an evolutionary lineage comprising species occurring in temperate to subpolar regions in both hemispheres. Pseudevernia has been estimated to have diverged from its closest ancestors during the Oligocene at 31.43 Ma, and is the earliest-diverging member of the Hypogymnioid clade.

Description

Pseudevernia lichens generally have a foliose (leafy) thallus, although occasionally it becomes almost fruticose in form. This is the case with P. cladonia, which has intricately branched lobes about 1 mm wide; the lobes of most other Pseudevernia species are 2–4 mm wide. The lower surface of the thallus often darkens to a purplish-black or mottled white colour, a striking feature that is characteristic of this genus.

Several secondary chemicals are produced amongst Pseudevernia lichens. All species in the genus produce atranorin in the cortex, while lecanoric acid, physodic acid, and olivetoric acid occur in the medullae of some species.

Species

Pseudevernia alectoronica Egan (2016) – Mexico
Pseudevernia cladonia (Tuck.) Hale & W.L.Culb. (1966) – eastern North America; Dominican Republic
Pseudevernia confusa (Du Rietz) R.Schub. & Klem. (1966)
Pseudevernia consocians (Vain.) Hale & W.L.Culb. (1966) – North America
Pseudevernia furfuracea (L.) Zopf (1903) – cosmopolitan
Pseudevernia intensa (Nyl.) Hale & W.L.Culb. (1966) – North America
Pseudevernia isidiophora (Zopf) Zopf (1903)
Pseudevernia mexicana Egan (2016)
Pseudevernia soralifera (Bitter) Zopf (1903) – Europe

Some species once classified in Pseudevernia have since been reduced to synonymy with other species, or have been transferred to other genera. These include:
Pseudevernia cirrhata  is now known as Hypotrachyna cirrhata.
Pseudevernia kamerunensis  is now known as Hypotrachyna sorocheila.
Pseudevernia molliuscula  and Pseudevernia thamnidiella  are synonymous Xanthoparmelia molliuscula.
Pseudevernia olivetorina  and Pseudevernia ericetorum  have been folded into synonymy with Pseudevernia furfuracea.
Pseudevernia mauritiana  is synonymous with Parmelia microblasta.
Pseudevernia polita  is now Parmotrema cetratum.

Molecular phylogenetic analysis suggests that the North American species P. consocians and P. intensa do not form separate monophyletic groups, and so might be the same species.

References

Cited literature

Parmeliaceae
Lichen genera
Lecanorales genera
Taxa named by Friedrich Wilhelm Zopf
Taxa described in 1903